O Astro may refer to:
 O Astro (2011 TV series), a Brazilian telenovela
 O Astro (1977 TV series), a Brazilian telenovela